The 1989 Campionati Internazionali di San Marino was a men's tennis tournament played on outdoor clay courts at Centro Sportivo Serravalle in San Marino and was part of the 1989 Grand Prix. It was the inaugural  edition of the tournament as an ATP Tour event and the second overall, following the initial challenger in 1988. It was held from 21 August until 27 August 1989. Unseeded José Francisco Altur, who entered the main draw as a qualifier, won the singles title.

Finals

Singles
 José Francisco Altur defeated  Roberto Azar 6–4, 6–1
 It was Francisco Altur's only singles title of his career.

Doubles
 Simone Colombo /  Claudio Mezzadri defeated  Pablo Albano /  Gustavo Luza 6–1, 4–6, 7–6

References

External links
 ITF tournament edition details

Campionati Internazionali di San Marino
San Marino CEPU Open
1989 in Sammarinese sport